Eastside is a 1999 American crime drama film directed by Lorena David, starring Mario Lopez, Elizabeth Bogush and Mark Damon Espinoza.

Cast
 Mario Lopez as Antonio Lopez
 Elizabeth Bogush as Claire Gabriel
 Mark Damon Espinoza as Horatio Lopez
 Efrain Figueroa as Armando de la Rosa
 Richard Lynch as Toad

Reception
Kevin Thomas of the Los Angeles Times called the film "sharp, fast and energetic" and wrote that it has "depth, dimension and wit". John Jimenez of the Video Store Magazine wrote that the film is "well-done" with "acting good enough to put it in a class above most in its genre."

TV Guide wrote that while the film was "sturdily acted", it is "basically a PSA aimed to point repeat offenders poised away from the path to perdition and on to the road to social service". Buzz McClain of the Video Business called the film "competent if unthrilling" and "too good-natured for its own good". Michael Speier of Variety wrote that while Lynch "invests his worldly wise caretaker with a degree of spirituality", the "supporting players are flat", and Lopez is "unconvincing as a young man who can steal cars and pull a trigger".

References

External links
 
 

American crime drama films
1999 crime drama films